Suvorovo is a town in northeastern Bulgaria, part of Varna Province. It is the administrative centre of the homonymous Suvorovo Municipality, which lies in the northwestern part of the Province. As of December 2009, it has a population of 4,723 inhabitants.

Suvorovo was originally named Kozludža during the Ottoman era (Kozluca in modern Turkish), usually spelled Kozludzha or Kozludja; this name still persists in Turkish. In 1934 it was renamed Novgradets. Its present name is in honor of Generalissimus Alexander Suvorov, one of the famous Russian military commanders, who won a decisive battle of the Russo-Turkish War of 1768–1774 in the vicinity of the modern town. The town has a historical museum, a community centre (chitalishte), an Eastern Orthodox church dedicated to the Ascension of Jesus and a mosque.

Municipality

Notable natives of the municipality include Esoteric Christian spiritual leader Peter Dunov (born in Nikolaevka; 1864–1944) and Movement for Rights and Freedoms president Ahmed Doğan (born in Pchelarovo, but spent his childhood in Drandar; 1954-)

Points of interest
Bulgaria's only 750 kV power substation is located just west of Suvorovo, at 43°18'52"N   27°30'25"E.

References

External links
 Suvorovo municipality website 
 www.suvorovo.net - main site of the SUVOROVO city

Towns in Bulgaria
Populated places in Varna Province
Alexander Suvorov